The 2004 Menards IRL Infiniti Pro Series Season was the series' third. It consisted of 12 races and the champion was Thiago Medeiros. All teams used Dallara chassis and Infiniti engines.

Calendar

Note:

Race 4 no qualifying held due to rain, starting grid depend on free practice.

Race Summaries

Homestead-Miami 100
The Homestead-Miami 100 was held February 29 at Homestead-Miami Speedway. Paul Dana won the pole.

Top 5 Results
 Phil Giebler
 Thiago Medeiros
 Jesse Mason
 Tony Turco
 Brad Pollard

Phoenix 100
The Phoenix 100 was held March 20 at Phoenix International Raceway. Thiago Medeiros won the pole.

Top 5 Results
 Thiago Medeiros
 Arie Luyendyk Jr.
 Leonardo Maia
 Jesse Mason
 Paul Dana

Futaba Freedom 100 
The Futaba Freedom 100 was held May 22 at the Indianapolis Motor Speedway. Thiago Medeiros won the pole.

Top 5 Results
 Thiago Medeiros
 Jeff Simmons
 Arie Luyendyk Jr.
 Jay Drake
 Phil Giebler

Aventis Racing for Kids 100
The Aventis Racing for Kids 100 was held July 3 at Kansas Speedway. Thiago Medeiros won the pole.

Top 5 Results
 Thiago Medeiros
 Paul Dana
 Alfred Unser
 Rolando Quintanilla
 Brad Pollard

Cleanevent 100
The Cleanevent 100 was held July 17 at Nashville Superspeedway. Thiago Medeiros won the pole.

Top 5 Results
 Thiago Medeiros
 Paul Dana
 Jesse Mason
 Billy Roe
 Alfred Unser

Milwaukee 100
The Milwaukee 100 was held July 25 at the Milwaukee Mile. Thiago Medeiros won the pole.

Top 5 Results
 Paul Dana
 P. J. Chesson
 Alfred Unser
 Jesse Mason
 Brad Pollard

Paramount Health Insurance 100
The Paramount Health Insurance 100 was held August 1 at Michigan International Speedway. Alfred Unser won the pole.

Top 5 Results
 P. J. Chesson
 Thiago Medeiros
 Alfred Unser
 Paul Dana
 Phil Giebler

Leonardo Maia finished fifth, but set down to seventh place due to technical infringement.

Kentucky 100
The Kentucky 100 was held August 14 at Kentucky Speedway. Travis Gregg won the pole.

Top 5 Results
 P. J. Chesson
 Paul Dana
 Leonardo Maia
 Arie Luyendyk Jr.
 Travis Gregg

Pikes Peak 100
The Pikes Peak 100 was held August 22 at Pikes Peak International Raceway. Jeff Simmons won the pole.

Top 5 Results
 P. J. Chesson
 Paul Dana
 Thiago Medeiros
 Jesse Mason
 Arie Luyendyk Jr.

Chicagoland 100
The Chicagoland 100 was held September 11 at Chicagoland Speedway. Thiago Medeiros won the pole.

Top 5 Results
 Thiago Medeiros
 Jeff Simmons
 Alfred Unser
 Arie Luyendyk Jr.
 P. J. Chesson

California 100
The California 100 was held October 2 at the California Speedway. Thiago Medeiros won the pole.

Top 5 Results
 James Chesson
 P. J. Chesson
 Phil Giebler
 Leonardo Maia
 Rolando Quintanilla

Texas 100
The Texas 100 was held October 16 at Texas Motor Speedway. Thiago Medeiros won the pole.

Top 5 Results
 Thiago Medeiros
 Travis Gregg
 Alfred Unser
 Arie Luyendyk Jr.
 P. J. Chesson

Final points standings

For every race points were awarded to all starters: 50 points to the winner, 40 for runner-up, 35 for third place, 32 for fourth place, 30 for fifth place, 28 for sixth place, 26 seventh place, 24 eighth place, 22 for ninth place, 20 for tenth place, winding down to 1 points for 28th place. Additional points were awarded to the driver leading the most laps (2 point). No additional points were awarded for the qualifying.

Note:

Race 12 P. J. Chesson had 25 points deduction, because he was responsible for debris.

Complete Overview

R9=retired, but classified NS13=did not start, but classified

Indy Lights seasons
Indy Pro Series
Infiniti Pro Series